Riley Township is one of twelve townships in Vigo County, Indiana, United States. As of the 2010 census, its population was 3,123 and it contained 1,260 housing units.

Geography

Cities, towns, villages
 Riley
 Terre Haute (southeast edge)

Unincorporated communities
 Keller

Adjacent townships
 Lost Creek Township (north)
 Posey Township, Clay County (northeast)
 Perry Township, Clay County (east)
 Pierson Township (south)
 Linton Township (southwest)
 Honey Creek Township (west)
 Harrison Township (northwest)

Cemeteries
The township contains six cemeteries: Cooper, Jones, Liberty, Mewhinney, Miner, and Oak Hill.

Lakes
 Lee Lake
 Wonder Lake

School districts
 Vigo County School Corporation

Political districts
 Indiana's 8th congressional district
 State House District 46
 State Senate District 39

References
 United States Census Bureau 2007 TIGER/Line Shapefiles
 United States Board on Geographic Names (GNIS)
 IndianaMap

External links

Townships in Vigo County, Indiana
Terre Haute metropolitan area
Townships in Indiana